Congenital blindness refers to a group of diseases and conditions occurring in childhood or early adolescence of below 16 years old, which, if left untreated, result in blindness or severe visual impairment that are likely to be permanent blindness later in life. Congenital blindness is a hereditary disease and can be cured by gene therapy. Visual loss in children or infant can occur either at the stage of prenatal (during the time of conception or intrauterine period) or postnatal stage (during birth). A variety of causes can promote congenital blindness but the most concern and highest cause of it is a genetic mutation. In general, 60% of congenital blindness cases are contributed from prenatal stage and 40% are contributed from inherited disease. However, most of the congenital blindness cases show that it can be avoidable or preventable with early treatment.

Causes 
Prenatal stage

Premature Birth
Refractive error
Congenital cataract
Retinopathy of prematurity (ROP)
Infection such as Ophtalmia neonatorum that happen during time of conception or intrauterine period
 Vitamin A deficiency  
 Measles

Postnatal stage

Genetic mutation

The mutation can usually be an autosomal recessive condition and unusual condition of infant happened where it forms retinoblastoma result from autosomal dominant condition. The mutation of Retinal pigment epithelium-specific 65 kDa protein (RPE65) gene which function to produce retinoid isomerohydrolase which is an enzyme. RPE65 performs a key role in the trans-cis isomerization of retinol in the retinal pigment epithelium of the eye. The palmitoylation of RPE65 serves to switch off the visual cycle in darkness and to switch it on in the light. Mutation in this gene causing disorder of phototransduction pathway through brain which detect light fail to function.

Diagnosis
Paediatric nurses, medical officers and paediatricians trained in eye screening could detect small or large eyeballs, nystagmus, strabismus, “white pupils” and birth defects like coloboma and aniridia. For pregnant women from family with history of congenital blindness will be closely monitor and need to carry out genetic test in order to identify is there mutation occur or not.

Gene therapy treatment 
Gene therapy treatment is done as an outpatient. Patients come to the hospital for the treatment, then return home. Patients do not need to be monitored strictly or stay in the hospital. The gene therapy treatment is in vivo which involves the use of a delivery vector to transmit the therapeutic gene into the targeted cells. The delivery vector uses a recombinant adeno-associated virus (AAV) carrying the RPE65 gene (AAV2-hRPE65v2). The procedure is a single injection of the AAV2-hRPE65v2 therapeutic gene into the unilateral subretinal of the eye. Gene therapy can only improve eye vision, but cannot cure the condition. The therapeutic gene, Voretigene neparvovec (Luxturna), was the first gene therapy approved by FDA for inherited diseases.

References 

Gene therapy